Natpukkaga is a 1998 Indian Tamil-language drama film directed by K. S. Ravikumar, starring R. Sarathkumar, Simran, Vijayakumar and Sujatha. It became a blockbuster upon release. The film won two Filmfare Awards South and Tamil Nadu State Film Awards, both ceremonies conferring Best Film and Best Actor (Sarathkumar). It was remade in Telugu by Ravikumar as Sneham Kosam (1999), and in Kannada as Diggajaru (2000). It is Sarath Kumar's 75th film.

Plot 
Chinnayya works for an aged landlord named Karunakaran aka Ayya in a village in Coimbatore district. Chinnayya has great respect and affection towards Karunakaran and Karunakaran too takes care of Chinnayya and looks after him as his own son. Karunakaran is extremely wealthy and his family is hereditarily respected in their village & surroundings. Karunakaran hates his eldest daughter Gowri and her husband Perusu for unknown reasons. 15 years earlier, he had ostracized them and gave a large share of his then wealth to Gowri. Prabhavathy, Karunakaran's younger daughter, arrives at the village after completing her education in the United States. After a series of incidents, Prabhavathy begins to love Chinnayya but he does not reciprocate, thinking that this would be a betrayal to Karunakaran's trust in him. But eventually, Chinnayya too understands Prabhavathy's love and reciprocates.

One day, suddenly, Prabhavathy accuses Chinnayya of trying to rape her. This angers Karunakaran, and he slaps Chinnayya and sends him away from his home. At this time, Muthaiya (also Sarath Kumar), Chinnayya's father, is released from jail after 14 years and comes to meet Karunakaran. Muthaiya also worked under Karunakaran earlier and was a trusted aide, but Prabhavathy gets angry at seeing Muthaiya and asks him to leave the house because he had been jailed for murdering Karunakaran's wife Lakshmi. Prabhavathy also reveals that she staged a drama to send Chinnayya away from her father. Karunakaran is shocked knowing the truth and feels bad that he misunderstood Chinnayya, believing his daughter's deception.

Chinnayya deeply hates his father Muthaiya since childhood as he believes Muthaiaya killed Lakshmi for money. He refuses to accept his father into his house and Karunakaran is forced to come to his rescue, and tells Chinnayya the truth.

Muthaiya was a childhood friend and loyal servant in Karunakaran's home. Karunakaran and his family treat Muthaiya as one of their own, despite others disregarding Muthaiya due to his lower caste. Perusu is Lakshmi's younger brother who was then a simple farmer, and he has a younger brother, Chinnaraasu . Since Karunakaran does not want to send his daughter to a place far off, her wedding is arranged with Perusu, with an agreement that Perusu will stay in Gowri's home. On the day of the wedding, Lakshmi learns about Perusu's affair with another woman and decides to cancel the wedding; Perusu grievously injures Lakshmi, hides her in a room, and proceeds to the wedding stage. However, Muthaiya finds Lakshmi and learns the truth about Perusu. The wedding is over before he can prevent it, so he does not want Perusu to go to jail as that would impact Gowri's life. Lakshmi dies from her injuries, and Muthaiya admits that he had murdered her for money and is arrested by the police. This leads Gowri and Prabhavathy to hate him and his family. Karunakaran does not believe this, so he meets Muthaiya in jail and asks him for the truth. Muthaiya tells the truth to Karunakaran and is promised that Karunakaran will not reveal this truth to anyone else as Gowri would be alone then.

Karunakaran agrees but sends Perusu away from his home. Karunakaran brings the then-12 year old boy Chinnayya to his home to care for him and the entire family protests. Perusu alleges that Chinnayya may be an illegitimate son of Karunakaran, resulting in such deep affection. Deeply angered by these words, Karunakaran banishes his son-in-law. Gowri also leaves his home without knowing the truth and understanding her father.

The story returns to the present, and the wedding of Prabhavathy and Perusu's brother Chinnarasu is planned. On the wedding day, Perusu's mistress comes back with her brother saying that he wishes to marry Perusu's daughter. During this event, the truth about Lakshmi's death is revealed which is witnessed by Gowri. Perusu tries to kill Gowri so that the wedding would not stop and they can take all of Karunakaran's properties. But, Muthaiya comes to Gowri's aid and saves her. Gowri apologises to him for misunderstanding him as Lakshmi's murderer. Gowri reveals the truth to everybody during the wedding. Perusu then tries to stab Gowri with a sword but Muthaiya saves her but instead he gets stabbed. Perusu is killed by Chinnaraasu with the sword, who felt remorseful after discovering the truth that Perusu killed their own sister, Lakshmi. After learning the truth, Prabavathy apologises to Muthaiya and hands over her to Karunakaran and succumbs to his fatal wound. Before dying, Muthaiya tells Chinnaya to take care of Karunakaran. Karunakaran then cries in front of Muthaiya's dead body and also dies. The movie ends with the marriage of Chinnayya and Prabhavathy.

Cast 

 Sarathkumar as Chinnaiya and Muthaiya (dual role)
 Simran as Prabhavathi
 Vijayakumar as Karunakaran/Periyaiyya
 Sujatha as Lakshmi
 Sithara as Gowri
 Mansoor Ali Khan as Gajapathy/Perusu
 Ranjith as Pasupathy/Sirusu
 R. Sundarrajan as Kanakku Pillai
 Senthil as Kunnan
 Manorama as Muthaiya's mother, Chinnaiya's grandmother
 Manobala as Madurai
 Anu Mohan as Anu
 Idichapuli Selvaraj as Selvaraj
 Pallavi as Perusu's Mistress
 Crane Manohar as Village Farmer
 Anitha as Kamakshi
 Sridevi as Selvi
 Kovai Senthil as Iyer
 Mahendran as Young Chinnaiya
 Hemalatha as Young Prabhavathi
 Kavithalaya Krishnan as Auto Driver (guest role)
 K. S. Ravikumar as Nondi Samiyar (guest role)

Production 
The story of Natpukkaga was written by the then 17-year old Jyothi Krishna, son of producer A. M. Rathnam. Director K. S. Ravikumar initially approached Mammootty to play the lead role. For reasons unknown, he declined the offer. Sarathkumar was then chosen to play the lead. The team had initially considered Soundarya, Meena and then Keerthi Reddy to play the leading female role; their unavailability led to Simran being cast.

Soundtrack 
There are six songs composed by Deva. Lyrics were by Kavignar Kalidasan. Sarathkumar and Vijayakumar made their singing debut with this film, performing "Namma Ayya Nallvarungo".

Release and reception 
Film critic D. S. Ramanujam wrote the film has been "delectably structured" and that "Sarath Kumar portrays both the roles with maturity". Ji of Kalki said the film could be watched for its vivacity. K. Vijiyan of New Straits Times wrote, "Natpukaga shows every sign that it will do well at the box-office".

Accolades

Remakes 
Natpukkaga was remade by Ravikumar in Telugu as Sneham Kosam (1999) and in Kannada as Diggajaru (2000).

References

External links 

1990s Tamil-language films
1997 drama films
1997 films
Films directed by K. S. Ravikumar
Films scored by Deva (composer)
Indian drama films
Tamil films remade in other languages